The Women's Pan American Cup is a women's international field hockey tournament organized by the Pan American Hockey Federation. The winning team becomes the champion of the Americas and qualifies for the FIH Hockey World Cup.

Argentina are the defending champions, winning the 2022 edition. Argentina are also the only team to have won the tournament, winning every edition so far.

The hosts together with six highest-ranked teams from the previous edition are qualified directly for the tournament, they are joined by the top team from the Women's Pan American Challenge or the top two teams if the host is already qualified.

Results

Summary

* = host nation

Team appearances

See also
Field hockey at the Pan American Games
Men's Pan American Cup
Women's Indoor Pan American Cup
Women's Pan American Challenge
Women's Pan American Junior Championship

References

External links
Pan American Cup on PAHF

 
Pan American Cup
Pan American Cup
Field hockey